Baba Jik Rural District is in the Central District of Chaldoran County, West Azerbaijan province, Iran. At the National Census of 2006, its population was 4,293 in 838 households. There were 3,597 inhabitants in 1,037 households at the following census of 2011. At the most recent census of 2016, the population of the rural district was 2,947 in 938 households. The largest of its 43 villages was Qaranqu, with 473 people.

References 

Chaldoran County

Rural Districts of West Azerbaijan Province

Populated places in West Azerbaijan Province

Populated places in Chaldoran County